Sound of the Sitar is an LP by Hindustani classical musician Ravi Shankar. It was released in 1965 on vinyl. It was later released on CD by BGO Records in 1993 and in a digitally remastered version through Angel Records in 2000.

Track listing
"Raga Malkauns (Alap)" – 10:02
"Raga Malkauns (Jor)" – 10:46
"Tala Sawari" – 7:29
"Pahari Dhun (Instrumental)" – 12:30

1965 albums
Ravi Shankar albums
Angel Records albums